HiPACT was an association of British universities which was formed in 1991 with an aim of widening participation in higher education.

Universities in the United Kingdom